Distant Thunder were a marching brass and percussion band (and latterly a drum corps) who competed in BYBA (British Youth Band Association) and Drum Corps Europe. They were based in Sharnbrook Upper School.

The Corps have since merged with Equinox Drum and Bugle Corps in 2010 to form Nexus Drum & Bugle Corps.

History

The band was originally formed in 1981 as Bedford and Kempston E flat drum and trumpet corps. In 1986, they were renamed the Buccaneers Drum and Bugle Corps before disbanding in 1999.

The corps then reformed as Distant Thunder Show Corps in 1999 by John Dimmick, Paul Bishop and Richard Harding.

Re-entering BYBA in Junior Class in the 2000 season, they grew in size and skill each season, winning DCE A-Class in 2004 and BYBA Division 2 in 2005. Moving to the highest class, Division 1, in 2006 the corps re-branded as a drum and bugle corps once again.

Merge with Equinox 
In January 2010, the corps merged with Equinox Drum and Bugle Corps of Biggleswade to form Nexus Drum & Bugle Corps.

Nexus Drum & Bugle Corps have since gone on to become 2010 Division 3 UK Champions.

Past shows
2000 - Johnny One Note/Georgia
2001 - Robbie Williams
2002 - Jazz and Swing
2003 - Harry Potter
2004 - The Phantom of the Opera
2005 - West Side Story
2006 - CGI: Reality Is Not Our Business
2007 - Wicked
2008 - Awakening the Elements

The Uniform

From toe to head, the marching member uniform from 2005 consisted of black shoes and socks followed by black trousers. The jacket was purple and white on each arm divided by a 90 degree black strip with a diamond in the middle and black gloves and gauntlets on the arms and hands. The diamond varied each year:
2005 - Silver
2006 - Black with either a white 0 or 1 (representing computer coding)
2007 - White with a black O and a green Z in the middle
2008 - Silver
The headgear was a white plastic cowboy hat with a black fabric around the middle, a black plume and silver highlights.

Trivia
On 28 October 2007 Distant Thunder played a static performance of their 2007 show at Wicked Day in London.

See also
 Drum Corps Europe
 Marching band

References

External links
 Distant Thunder Official Website - Since the merger with Equinox D&BC to form Nexus, this website is no longer active.
 NeXuS Drum and Bugle Corps - Resultant from the merger with Equinox D&BC

English marching bands
Musical groups established in 1999
1999 establishments in England